Nyaungyan Mintaya Ayedawbon is an 18th-century Burmese chronicle of King Nyaungyan (r. 1599–1605) of Toungoo Dynasty.

The chronicle was written by an early Konbaung period writer, believed to be either Maha Atula Dammikayaza or Letwe Nawrahta. According to scholarship, it is a compilation of two earlier works: Minye Deibba Eigyin, a chronicle in verse written by Shin Than Kho in 1608, and Maha Yazawin the standard chronicle of Toungoo Dynasty, written in 1724.

References

Bibliography
 

Burmese chronicles